175 (one hundred [and] seventy-five) is the natural number following 174 and preceding 176.

In mathematics
Raising the decimal digits of 175 to the powers of successive integers produces 175 back again: 

175 is a figurate number for a rhombic dodecahedron, the difference of two consecutive fourth powers:  It is also a decagonal number and a decagonal pyramid number, the smallest number after 1 that has both properties.

In other fields
In the Book of Genesis 25:7-8, Abraham is said to have lived to be 175 years old.

175 is the fire emergency number in Lebanon.

See also
 The year AD 175 or 175 BC
 List of highways numbered 175

References 

Integers